Tanaka Chinyahara (born 12 October 1995) is a Zimbabwean professional footballer who plays for Zambian club Red Arrows, as a midfielder.

Club career
Chinyahara spent his early career with CAPS United, Kaizer Chiefs and Bidvest Wits.

In July 2015, Chinayhara moved to Danish club Hobro IK. He made his league debut for the club on 18 October 2015 in a 3–1 away loss to F.C. Copenhagen. He was subbed on for Mads Jessen in the 62nd minute. In August 2016, he was loaned out to Danish 2nd Division club Jammerbugt FC for the rest of 2016.

On 7 March 2019, Chinyahara joined  South African club Witbank Spurs. In February 2020 he was one of six players to sign for Zambian club Red Arrows.

International career
He was called-up by the Zimbabwean national team in October 2020.

References

1995 births
Living people
Zimbabwean footballers
CAPS United players
Kaizer Chiefs F.C. players
Bidvest Wits F.C. players
Hobro IK players
Jammerbugt FC players
Witbank Spurs F.C. players
Red Arrows F.C. players
Danish Superliga players
Danish 2nd Division players
Association football midfielders
Zimbabwean expatriate footballers
Zimbabwean expatriate sportspeople in South Africa
Expatriate soccer players in South Africa
Zimbabwean expatriate sportspeople in Denmark
Expatriate men's footballers in Denmark
Zimbabwean expatriate sportspeople in Zambia
Expatriate footballers in Zambia